The Dampier Land limbless slider (Lerista apoda)  is a species of skink found in Western Australia.

References

Lerista
Reptiles described in 1976
Taxa named by Glen Milton Storr